Walter Williams (born July 10, 1954) is a former professional American football cornerback in the National Football League and restaurateur.

Born in the South Bronx, N.Y., Williams and his five siblings became wards of the state at age 7. He lived in two children’s shelters, spending most of his time at one in Westchester County, learning culinary arts and playing football.

After high school, he started hitchhiking to California but ended up in New Mexico. He attended New Mexico State University in Las Cruces, where he played football. He was a second round draft pick for the Detroit Lions in the 1970s. He moved on to the Minnesota Vikings and Chicago Bears, playing a total of eight years.

He played seven seasons for the Detroit Lions, the Minnesota Vikings, and the Chicago Bears.
After retiring from football in the early 1980s, Williams started a real estate development company in New Mexico. When the market crashed, he lost about $480 million. He moved to Dallas and started a restaurant called Sweet Georgia Brown.

References

1954 births
Living people
People from Bedford Hills, New York
Players of American football from New York (state)
American football cornerbacks
New Mexico State Aggies football players
Detroit Lions players
Minnesota Vikings players
Chicago Bears players